The Supreme Court of Texas (SCOTX) is the court of last resort for civil matters (including juvenile delinquency cases, which are categorized as civil under the Texas Family Code) in the U.S. state of Texas. A different court, the Texas Court of Criminal Appeals (CCA), is the court of last resort in criminal matters.

The Court has its seat at the Supreme Court Building on the State Capitol grounds in Austin, Texas.

The Texas Supreme Court consists of a Chief Justice and eight associate justices. All nine positions are elected, with a term of office of six years and no term limit.

The Texas Supreme Court was established in 1846 to replace the Supreme Court of the Republic of Texas. It meets in Downtown Austin, Texas in an office building near the Texas State Capitol.

Regulation of the practice of law in Texas courts
By statute, the Texas Supreme Court has administrative control over the State Bar of Texas, an agency of the judiciary.  The Texas Supreme Court has the sole authority to license attorneys in Texas. It also appoints the members of the Board of Law Examiners which, under instructions of the Supreme Court, administers the Texas bar exam. The Court has the last word in attorney disciplinary proceedings brought by the Commission for Lawyer Discipline, a committee of the State Bar of Texas, but rarely exercises discretionary review in such cases. The Supreme Court accepts fewer than 100 cases per year to be decided on the merits. In addition to its adjudicatory and administrative functions, the Supreme Court promulgates, and occasionally revises, court rules of procedure, which include the Texas Rules of Civil Procedure (TRCP), the Texas Rules of Evidence (TRE), and the Texas Rules of Appellate Procedure (TRAP).

Unique procedural aspects

The Texas Supreme Court is the only state supreme court in the United States in which the manner in which it denies discretionary review can actually imply approval or disapproval of the merits of the lower court's decision and in turn may affect the geographic extent of the precedential effect of that decision. In March 1927, the Texas Legislature enacted a law directing the Texas Supreme Court to summarily refuse to hear applications for writs of error when it believed the Court of Appeals opinion correctly stated the law. Thus, since June 1927, over 4,100 decisions of the Texas Courts of Appeals have become valid binding precedent of the Texas Supreme Court itself because the high court refused applications for writ of error rather than denying them and thereby signaled that it approved of their holdings as the law of the state.

While Texas's unique practice saved the state supreme court from having to hear relatively minor cases just to create uniform statewide precedents on those issues, it also makes for lengthy citations to the opinions of the Courts of Appeals, since the subsequent writ history of the case must always be noted (e.g., no writ, writ refused, writ denied, etc.) in order for the reader to determine at a glance whether the cited opinion is binding precedent only in the district of the Court of Appeals in which it was decided, or binding precedent for the entire state. Citations to cases from the Houston-based Courts of Appeals are also longer than others because they require identification of the appellate district number -- [1st Dist.] or [14th Dist.] -- in addition to the name of the city.

Structure of the court and membership
The Texas Supreme Court consists of a Chief Justice and eight associate justices. All positions are elective. While the chief has special administrative responsibilities, each member has one vote and may issue a dissenting or concurring opinion. Granted cases are assigned to justices' chambers for opinion authorship by draw. Grants require four votes. Judgments are rendered by majority vote. Per curiam opinions may be issued if at least six justices agree. Petitions for review are automatically denied after 30 days unless at least one justice pulls them off the metaphorical conveyor belt.

To serve on the court, a candidate must be at least 35 years of age, a citizen of Texas, licensed to practice law in Texas, and must have practiced law (or have been a lawyer and a judge of a court of record together) for at least ten years. The Clerk of the Court, currently Blake A. Hawthorne, is appointed by the Justices and serves a four-year term, which is renewable.

All members of the Texas Supreme Court typically belong to the same party because all are elected in statewide races, rather than by the electorates of smaller appellate districts, as the justices on the intermediate appellate courts are. Although there are fourteen such courts, the state is geographically divided into thirteen. Two appellate courts (the 1st and the 14th, sitting in Houston) serve coextensive districts covering ten counties, including Harris County. Recent proposals to reorganize the Texas appellate court system by consolidating districts, and creating a specialty court of appeals for government-entity cases, failed in the Texas legislature's 2021 regular session.

Judicial selection: appointments and elections 

All members of the court are elected to six-year terms in statewide partisan elections. Because their terms are staggered, only a subset of justices is up for re-election in any one election cycle.  When a vacancy arises, the Governor of Texas appoints a replacement, subject to Senate confirmation, to serve out the unexpired term until  December 31 after the next general election. The initial term of tenure is therefore often less than six years. Most of the current justices were originally appointed either by former Governor Rick Perry or by the current Governor of Texas, Greg Abbott, who is himself a former member of the SCOTX.

Like the judges on the Texas Court of Criminal Appeals, all members of the Texas Supreme Court are currently Republicans.

The most recent appointees are Evan Young, Rebeca Huddle, Jane Bland, Jimmy Blacklock, and Brett Busby.

Prior public service of incumbents 
Brett Busby and Jane Bland are former Court of Appeals justices from Houston, whose re-election bids failed in November 2018 when Democrats won all of the judicial races in that election. Blacklock previously served Governor Greg Abbott as general counsel. Huddle was a justice on the First Court of Appeals in Houston.

Blacklock replaced Don Willett, who now sits on the Fifth Circuit Court of Appeals, the federal appellate court that hears appeals from federal district courts in Texas. Busby succeeds Phil Johnson, who retired in 2018, and was sworn in on  March 20, 2019. Jane Bland was appointed in September 2019 to fill the vacancy left by Jeff Brown, who resigned from the SCOTX to accept appointment to a U.S. district court bench. Rebeca Huddle was appointed in October 2020 to replace Paul Green, who retired from the Court on August 31, 2020. Eva Guzman, the second-most senior member of the Court at the time, resigned on June 11, 2021. She is currently challenging Attorney General Ken Paxton in the GOP primary for that office. The vacancy created by Guzman's resignation was filled by Evan Young's appointment on November 10, 2021.

Position designations and seniority 
The position of Chief Justice is designated Place 1 and is currently held by Nathan Hecht, the longest-serving member of the Court. He succeeded Wallace B. Jefferson, who is now a frequent advocate before the high court on behalf of private clients, as are several other former members of the Court. The other eight position numbers have no special significance except for identification purposes on the ballot. Informally, justices are ranked by seniority, and their profiles appear on the Court's website in that order. Unlike their counterparts on the U.S. Supreme Court, the official title of incumbents holding Place 2 through Place 9 is Justice, rather than Associate Justice. Their counterparts on the Court of Criminal Appeals, however, use the title Judge.

Women on the court
Hortense Sparks Ward, who became the first woman to pass the Texas Bar Exam in 1910, was appointed Special Chief Justice of an all-female Texas Supreme Court 15 years later. All of the court's male justices recused themselves from Johnson v. Darr, a 1924 case involving the Woodmen of the World, and, since nearly every member of the Texas Bar was a member of that fraternal organization, paying personal insurance premiums that varied with the claims decided against it, no male judges or attorneys could be found to hear the case. After ten months of searching for suitable male replacements to decide the case, Governor Pat Neff decided on January 1, 1925, to appoint a special court composed of three women. This court, consisting of Ward, Hattie Leah Henenberg, and Ruth Virginia Brazzil, met for five months and ultimately ruled in favor of Woodmen of the World.

On July 25, 1982, Ruby Kless Sondock became the court's first regular female justice, when she was appointed to replace the Associate Justice James G. Denton who had died of a heart attack. Sondock served the remainder of Denton's term, which ended on December 31, 1982, but did not seek election to the Supreme Court in her own right. Rose Spector became the first woman elected to the court in 1992 and served until 1998 when she was defeated by Harriet O'Neill.

Following the recent departure of Eva Guzman, the Texas Supreme Court currently has three women members. One of them served as a family court judge in Fort Worth (Lehrmann), the second (Bland) was a district judge in the civil trial division of the Harris County district courts before she was appointed to the intermediate court of appeals, and the third (Huddle) previously served on an intermediate court of appeals in Houston. As of September 2019, women jurists filled almost half of the 80 intermediate appellate positions. Some of the fourteen intermediate courts of appeals have female majorities. The Fourth Court of Appeals, based in San Antonio, is composed entirely of women.

Justice Eva Guzman resigned from Place 9 effective Friday, June 11, 2021 at 3 PM after delivering a final dissenting opinion in the morning.

Current justices

History of membership of the court

Succession of seats

Supreme Court committees

Judicial Committee on Information Technology (JCIT)

Created in 1997 JCIT was established to set standards and guidelines for the systematic implementation and integration of information technology into the trial and appellate courts in Texas.

JCIT approaches this mission by providing a forum for state-local, inter-branch, and public-private collaboration, and development of policy recommendations for the Supreme Court of Texas. Court technology, and the information it carries, are sprawling topics, and Texas is a diverse state with decentralized funding and decision-making for trial court technology. JCIT provides a forum for discussion of court technology and information projects. With this forum, JCIT reaches out to external partners such as the Conference of Urban Counties, the County Information Resource Agency, Texas.gov, and TIJIS (Texas Integrated Justice Information Systems), and advises or is consulted by the Office of Court Administration on a variety of projects.

Three themes consistently recur in the JCIT conversation: expansion and governance of electronic filing; the evolution and proliferation of court case management systems; and the evolution and governance of technology standards for reporting and sharing information across systems in civil, family, juvenile, and criminal justice.

The Founding Chair of JCIT from 1997 to 2009 was Peter S. Vogel, a partner at Gardere Wynne Sewell LLP in Dallas, and since 2009 the JCIT Chair has been Justice Rebecca Simmons.

Texas Supreme Court judicial elections

2020 
Two members of the Court (Chief Justice Hecht and Justice Boyd) were up for re-election in 2020, and two more (Busby and Bland) were on the ballot to seek voter approval to serve out the remainder of their respective unexpired terms, following their appointment to supreme court vacancies by Governor Abbott. Although there was some speculation about Texas turning blue in the November 3, 2020 general elections, all GOP candidates in statewide races won, including the four Supreme Court incumbents.

2018 

While Republican incumbents suffered massive defeats in the Courts of Appeals on November 6, 2018, bringing about a switch of majorities from Republicans to Democrats in Dallas, Houston, and Austin, the three Republican incumbents on the Texas Supreme Court who faced the entire Texas electorate in statewide races won comfortably.

Incumbent John Devine prevailed over his opponent R.K. Sandill, a sitting district court judge of Asian-American descent in Houston, with 53.75% of the vote and secured a second term. Justice Jeff Brown beat off a challenge by Democratic candidate Kathy Cheng (who unlike her fellow Democratic challengers did not have comparable judicial experience) with the same vote margin. The high court's most recent appointed member at the time, Jimmy Blacklock, defeated Steven Kirkland, who like Sandill served as a district court judge in Houston, with 53.17% of the vote. Neither Sandill nor Kirkland were up for reelection that year. 

Justice Blacklock faced the electorate for the first time, having recently been appointed. Blacklock was Governor Abbott's replacement for Justice Don Willett, who ascended to the Fifth Circuit Court of Appeals before his term on the Texas Supreme Court had expired, thus creating a vacancy and an opportunity for the Governor to fill it with an already-vetted candidate of his own.

All appellate court races were clearly driven by party-line voting. That worked in favor of Republican incumbents at the statewide level as usual, but against Republican incumbents in the courts of appeals, whose members are each elected from one of fourteen appellate districts. Some of those districts favored Democrats in the 2018 midterm elections, which entailed heavy Republican losses at the trial court level likewise.

Under the leadership of Governor Greg Abbott Texas Republicans have since moved to change the way Texas selects judges and justices in the major metropolitan jurisdictions. Their legislative initiative to amend the Texas constitution to forestall Democratic gains in third branch of government was unsuccessful, but a commission was formed to look at alternative selection methods.

2016 
The six-year terms of office of the members of the Texas Supreme Court are staggered. Three Republican incumbents -- Green, Guzman, and Lehrmann -- were up for reelection in 2016 and won easily, as was expected, given the statewide nature of their electoral constituency in a Red state. Debra Lehrmann had been challenged by Michael Massengale, then a justice on the First Court of Appeals in Houston, in the Republican primary for not being conservative enough with respect to med-mal suits. Massengale later lost his re-election bid for the First Court of Appeals position to a Democrat, Richard Hightower, in the Democratic sweep of the intermediate courts of appeals in November 2018.

2014 

Texas is one of seven states that elects Supreme Court justices on partisan ballots. Four justices of the Texas Supreme Court faced re-election in 2014. Three of the four sitting Supreme Court Justices, Chief Justice Nathan Hecht, Justice Jeff Brown and Justice Phil Johnson, were required to defeat challengers in a March primary before the general election in November. The candidates challenging the incumbent Supreme Court Justices, according to reports filed with the Texas Ethics Commission, were recruited for the election and funded by a Houston plaintiff lawyer and Ali Davari, owner of two strip clubs: Sexy City and Erotic Zone.

Texas for Lawsuit Reform commented on the Texas election by saying, "Plaintiff trial lawyers are making an unprecedented attempt to regain the control of the Supreme Court that they enjoyed in the 1970s and 1980s, when Texas was known as 'The Lawsuit Capitol of the World.'" Also, an airing of Sixty Minutes entitled Justice for Sale gave a devastating critique of the Texas Supreme Court. 
 
Houston plaintiff lawyer Mark Lanier, funded the bulk of the campaign to remove the Texas Supreme Court and business groups. Funding was disclosed in an article titled "Plaintiff Trial Lawyers Attempt to Distort Role of Judges and Juries".

In the years preceding the Texas Judicial Election, Lanier had become a vocal critic of the Texas Supreme Court after the Supreme Court reversed his signature trial verdict against Merck & Co. on behalf of a widow whose husband died after taking Vioxx.  After Lanier suffered a second high-profile loss of a Vioxx case, in which the Fourteenth Court of Appeals in Houston concluded in MERCK & CO., INC. v. Ernst, a wrongful death case by a widow, that Lanier failed to show that the ingestion of Vioxx caused the death of his client's spouse. Lanier's publicly criticized the Texas Supreme Court stating that it employs "a simpleton approach that basically white washes the trial, ignores the evidence, and is very conclusion based".

Lanier responded to the appellate setbacks in a press release:

 
 
All judicial challengers recruited and funded by the Texas plaintiff lawyers lost to the incumbent Texas Supreme Court justices who won the 2014 Texas election.

References

Further reading
 Haley, James L. The Texas Supreme Court: A Narrative History, 1836–1986 (Austin: University of Texas Press, 2013). xxviii, 322 pp.

External links

 Official Website for the Texas Supreme Court
Texas Supreme Court History: Links to Resources
  
 The Texas Reports, the decisions of the Texas Supreme Court from 1846 to 1885, hosted by the Portal to Texas History
 "Judiciary" (by Paul Womack) from The Handbook of Texas Online  (Texas State Historical Association)
 Texas Supreme Court Historical Society

Texas
Texas state courts
1840 establishments in the Republic of Texas
Government agencies established in 1840